Luis Ramos Jr. is a Mexican American former professional boxer.

Amateur career
Ramos began boxing at the age of 10 in Santa Ana, California. His first trainer was Manuel Garcia. After a few years, he moved on to train with Hector Lopez. He went on to compete as a top amateur, winning several national championships. As an amateur, he ended his career with a 120–16 record. After falling short of a spot on the 2008 Olympic team, Ramos turned pro.

Professional career
Ramos made his pro debut as a lightweight on October 19, 2007, knocking out Christian Jose Reyes in one round. Over the next year, Luis continued his strong start, knocking out two of his four opponents in the first round. On July 30, 2007, Luis faced fellow rising prospect Aaron Dominguez, stopping him in the fifth round.

In July 2009 Ramos was signed to Oscar De La Hoya's Golden Boy Promotions.

Ramos won his next eight fights in the lightweight division before moving up to light welterweight.

On May 1, 2010, Ramos faced Allen Litzau on the undercard of the Floyd Mayweather vs. Shane Mosley bout at the MGM Grand Las Vegas. The first of his fights at light welterweight, he defeated Litzau via second-round TKO.

On January 6, 2012, Ramos fought Raymundo Beltran in the headline event of Showtime's ShoBox. A veteran boxer and sparring partner of Manny Pacquiao, Beltran was Ramo's toughest opponent to date. In a hard-fought contest, Ramos won by unanimous decision, winning the vacant NABA USA lightweight title.

Ramos was stopped in his last two fights, one against Ricardo Williams Jr. on December 8, 2012, and recently Fidel Maldonado on November 11, 2013, on Fox Sports 1. In both fights, Ramos suffered cuts. Against Williams, the referee and doctor put a stop to the action in the 5th round due to the cut. In his fight against Maldonado, Ramos Jr. was cut in the first round and ultimately being KO'd in the 7th round at the 17 second mark. Ramos is now in a scary portion of his career where his dream to chase a world championship is starting to drift away following these two fights against inferior opponents.

Professional boxing record

|- style="margin:0.5em auto; font-size:95%;"
|align="center" colspan=8|26 Wins (10 knockouts), 2 Losses 0 Draws
|- style="margin:0.5em auto; font-size:95%;"
|align=center style="border-style: none none solid solid; background: #e3e3e3"|Res.
|align=center style="border-style: none none solid solid; background: #e3e3e3"|Record
|align=center style="border-style: none none solid solid; background: #e3e3e3"|Opponent
|align=center style="border-style: none none solid solid; background: #e3e3e3"|Type
|align=center style="border-style: none none solid solid; background: #e3e3e3"|Rd., Time
|align=center style="border-style: none none solid solid; background: #e3e3e3"|Date
|align=center style="border-style: none none solid solid; background: #e3e3e3"|Location
|align=center style="border-style: none none solid solid; background: #e3e3e3"|Notes
|-align=center
|Win || 26–2 ||align=left| Cristobal Cruz
|UD || 8  || April 2, 2016 ||align=left|Oceanview Pavilion, Port Hueneme
|align=left|
|-align=center
|Win || 25–2 ||align=left| Moises Delgadillo
|UD || 4  || December 12, 2015 ||align=left|Convention Center, Tucson
|align=left|
|-align=center
|Win || 24–2 ||align=left| Sergio Reyes
|UD || 6  || August 22, 2015 ||align=left|Churchill County Fairgrounds, Fallon
|align=left|
|-align=center
|Loss || 23–2 ||align=left| Fidel Maldonado, Jr.
|TKO || 7  || November 11, 2013 ||align=left|Cowboys Dance Hall, San Antonio
|align=left|
|-align=center
|Loss || 23–1 ||align=left| Ricardo Williams Jr.
|RTD || 5  || December 8, 2012 ||align=left|Business Expo Center, Anaheim
|align=left|
|-align=center
|Win || 23–0 ||align=left| Noe Bolaños
|TKO || 8  || September 8, 2012 ||align=left|The Hangar, Costa Mesa
|align=left|
|-align=center
|Win || 22–0 ||align=left| Daniel Attah
|UD || 10  || April 21, 2012 ||align=left|Don Haskins Convention Center, El Paso
|align=left|
|-align=center
|Win || 21–0 ||align=left| Raymundo Beltran
|UD || 10  || January 6, 2012 ||align=left|Fantasy Springs Casino, Indio, California
|align=left|Won vacant NABA USA lightweight title
|-align=center
|Win || 20–0 ||align=left| David Rodela
|KO || 5 , (1:57) || September 30, 2011 ||align=left|Orange County Fairgrounds, Costa Mesa, California
|align=left|
|-align=center
|Win || 19–0 ||align=left| Francisco Lorenzo
|UD || 8  || June 3, 2011 ||align=left|Fantasy Springs Casino, Indio, California
|align=left|
|-align=center
|Win || 18–0 ||align=left| Jose Hernandez
|UD || 8  || March 18, 2011 ||align=left|Orange County Fairgrounds, Costa Mesa, California
|align=left|
|-align=center
|Win || 17–0 ||align=left| John Figueroa
|UD || 8  || September 17, 2010 ||align=left|Parking Lot 7 at LA Live, Los Angeles, California
|align=left|
|-align=center
|Win || 16–0 ||align=left| Joshua Allotey
|UD || 8 ) || June 18, 2010 ||align=left|Convention Center, McAllen, Texas
|align=left|
|-align=center   
|Win || 15–0 ||align=left| Allen Litzau
|TKO || 2 , (0:55) || May 1, 2010 ||align=left|MGM Grand, Las Vegas, Nevada
|align=left|
|-align=center   
|Win || 14–0 ||align=left| Walter Estrada
|UD || 4  || February 25, 2010
|align=left|Club Nokia, Los Angeles, California
|align=left|
|-align=center   
|Win || 13–0 ||align=left| Cristian Favela
|UD || 6  || September 24, 2009 ||align=left|Hard Rock Hotel and Casino, Las Vegas, Nevada
|align=left|
|-align=center
|Win || 12–0 ||align=left| Sandro Marcos
|TKO || 6 , (0:59) || July 30, 2009 ||align=left|Club Nokia, Los Angeles, California
|align=left|
|-align=center
|Win || 11–0 ||align=left| Baudel Cardenas
|KO || 5 , (2:26) || June 11, 2009 ||align=left|Club Nokia, Los Angeles, California
|align=left|
|-align=center
|Win || 10–0 ||align=left| Anthony Martinez
|UD || 4  || March 7, 2009 ||align=left|HP Pavilion, San Jose, California
|align=left|
|-align=center
|Win || 9–0 ||align=left| Justo Vallecillo
|UD || 6  || December 11, 2008 ||align=left|Marriott Hotel, Irvine, California
|align=left|
|-align=center
|Win || 8–0 ||align=left| Sadot Vazquez
|UD || 6  || October 24, 2008 ||align=left|Doubletree Hotel, Ontario, California
|align=left|
|-align=center
|Win || 7–0 ||align=left| Celestino Rodriguez
|TKO || 1 , (2:30) || September 26, 2008 ||align=left|Doubletree Hotel, Ontario, California
|align=left|
|-align=center
|Win || 6–0 ||align=left| Aaron Dominguez
|RTD || 5 , (3:00) || July 30, 2008 ||align=left|Sycuan Resort & Casino, El Cajon, California
|align=left|
|-align=center
|Win || 5–0 ||align=left| Noe Jimenez
|KO || 1 , (2:30) || June 27, 2008 ||align=left|Doubletree Hotel, Ontario, California
|align=left|
|-align=center
|Win || 4–0 ||align=left| Michaelangelo Lynks
|UD || 4  || April 24, 2008 ||align=left|Marriott Hotel, Irvine, California
|align=left|
|-align=center
|Win || 3–0 ||align=left| Daniel Lorenzana
|UD || 4  || February 21, 2008 ||align=left|Marriott Hotel, Irvine, California
|align=left|
|-align=center
|Win || 2–0 ||align=left| Terrence Harris
|TKO || 1 , (1:44) || November 29, 2007 ||align=left|Marriott Hotel, Irvine, California
|align=left|
|-align=center
|Win || 1–0 ||align=left| Christian Jose Reyes
|KO || 1 , (2:17) || October 19, 2007 ||align=left|Doubletree Hotel, Irvine, California
|align=left|
|-align=center

References

External links

Living people
American boxers of Mexican descent
Light-welterweight boxers
American male boxers
People from Santa Ana, California
Boxers from California
Southpaw boxers
Year of birth missing (living people)